Unbreakable is the second studio album from Saving Grace. Strike First Records released the album on January 5, 2010. Saving Grace worked with Zorran Mendonsa, in the production of this album.

Critical reception

Awarding the album four stars from Jesus Freak Hideout, Timothy Estabrooks states, "Unbreakable is an album that is exciting at times and at its worst is never less than a solid effort." Scott Fryberger, giving the album three stars for Jesus Freak Hideout, writes, "This isn't a fantastic album, by any means, but it's a good start for the band". Rating the album six out of ten at Cross Rhythms, Peter John Willoughby says, "these guys are relatively newcomers and comparisons to an established band like As I Lay Dying would be unfair". Steve, awarding the album four stars from Indie Vision Music, describes, "This brutal album is sure to please any metalcore fan out there." Giving the album five stars by The New Review, Ben Westerman writes, "It's heavy, brutal, aggressive, and will leave your eardrums broken and beaten; but it's an experience that any fan of metal should be able to appreciate and will likely enjoy!"

Track listing

Credits
Saving Grace
Nicholas Tautuhi - Vocals
Vasely Sapunov - Guitars
George White - Bass
Ben Davidson - Drums
Production
Dave Quiggle - Artwork

References

2010 albums
Saving Grace (band) albums
Facedown Records albums